The 2013 Rally Liepāja-Ventspils was the second round of the 2013 European Rally Championship. The stages were mainly gravel with snowy and icy parts. Jari Ketomaa won the event after a huge fight with runner-up Craig Breen. François Delecour rounded off the podium places. The 2WD Cup was won by Risto Immonen, while the Production Cup honors went to Švedas Vytautas.

Results

Special stages

References

Latvia
Rally Liepaja-Ventspils
Rally Liepāja